Elvis Kotorri (born 30 April 1979) is an Albanian retired footballer who played as a goalkeeper. He was manager of Elbasani during the 2018–19 season.

Playing career

First spell with Dinamo Tirana
Kotorri joined Dinamo Tirana in the summer of 2007. During the 2007–08 season, he was the first choice in goal, making 33 league appearances, as Dinamo won the title for the 17th time.

Shkumbini Peqin
On 13 July 2010, Kotorri joined Shkumbini Peqin on a free transfer by signing a contract until July 2012, being presented to the media on the same day.

Besa Kavajë
In December 2010, Kotorri signed with fellow Albanian Superliga side Besa Kavajë after terminating his contract with Shkumbini Peqin by mutual consent.

Return to Shkumbini Peqin
In September 2011, Kotorri returned to Shkumbini Peqin for the 2011–12 season after spending the second part of 2010–11 season on loan at fellow Albanian Superliga side Besa Kavajë.

Elbasani
On 23 July 2013, Kotorri completed a transfer to his boyhood club Elbasani by signing a one-year contract.

On 15 March 2014, he scored his first goal of 2013–14 season via a penalty kick in Elbasani's 1–0 defeat of Tomori Berat. During 2013–14 season with Elbasani, Kotorri was the first choice, playing 27 matches through the season, with Elbasani winning the Albanian First Division, finished in first place with four points ahead of Apolonia Fier.

On 23 August 2014, Kotorri made his first league appearance for Elbasani in 2014–15 season in the opening match against Skënderbeu Korçë at neutral ground Qemal Stafa Stadium, playing the whole match which ended in a 0–1 defeat.

Later career
On 21 January 2015, during the winter transfer window, Kotorri was signed by his old side Dinamo Tirana for the second part of 2014–15 season, returning at the club after five years. After making 15 league appearances, he left the club on 7 August 2015.

In August 2015, he remained in the first division by joining fellow side Korabi Peshkopi. He left the club on controversial fashion after only one year after falling out with management, especially coach Artan Mërgjyshi.

Managerial career
Kotorri replaced Eriol Merxha as manager of Elbasan after only the second week of the 2018/19 season, but resigned from his post in early March 2019.

Honours
Elbasani
Albanian Superliga: 2005–06
Albanian First Division: 2013–14

Dinamo Tirana
Albanian Superliga: 2009–10

References

External links
 AFA profile
 
 

1979 births
Living people
Footballers from Elbasan
Albanian footballers
Association football goalkeepers
KF Elbasani players
KS Shkumbini Peqin players
FK Dinamo Tirana players
Besa Kavajë players
KF Korabi Peshkopi players
Kategoria Superiore players
Kategoria e Parë players
Albanian football managers
KF Elbasani managers